The Cloverland Garage is a historic building in Cloverland, Washington. The building was built in 1902, shortly after Cloverland was platted, and originally served as a store and dance hall. The wood-frame building has a vernacular design with a false front. While it continued to serve as a store, the building became Cloverland's post office in 1903 and its first telephone exchange in 1904. In 1918, Fred W. Walter converted the building to be Cloverland's first automobile garage. The new building served as an automobile repair shop, a filling station, and a Buick and GMC dealership. After 1928, Walter moved from his apartment above the garage to a farm, and the garage offered less frequent service.

The garage was added to the National Register of Historic Places in 1986.

References

Buildings designated early commercial in the National Register of Historic Places
Commercial buildings completed in 1902
Buildings and structures in Asotin County, Washington
Gas stations on the National Register of Historic Places in Washington (state)
National Register of Historic Places in Asotin County, Washington
Western false front architecture